The Casket Factory is the 6th studio album, and 10th overall album from American rapper Blaze Ya Dead Homie. It was released on January 15, 2016 on Majik Ninja Entertainment.

Background
Shortly after the release of Gang Rags: Reborn, Blaze Ya Dead Homie announced in March 2015 that he would be releasing his new album in 2015 and that it would be titled The Casket Factory. In June 2015, he stated that the album would be released in 2015, but that the date would not be certain until after his tour with Kottonmouth Kings. A few days later, Twiztid said that the album was coming along nicely, and was nearing the finishing stages. At the 2015 GOTJ, during Twiztid's seminar, it was announced that The Casket Factory would be released on January 15, 2016.

Singles and music videos
The lead single, "Ghost" featuring Kung Fu Vampire, was released on August 18, 2015, with the second single "Wormfood" being released three days later. The third single, "They Call That Gangsta," featuring Blaze's Zodiac MPrint cohort The R.O.C. and the newest Majik Ninja Entertainment signee Lex the Hex Master, was released on December 23, 2015 and it was accompanied by a music video. On January 30, 2016 the music video for "Wormfood" was released. On March 23, 2016, the fourth single "Who U Lookin 4?", featuring Boondox with Jamie Madrox on the hook, was released and was also accompanied by a music video. On August 31, 2017, the music video for "Eternal" was released.

Track list
Singles are in bold

Personnel
 Blaze Ya Dead Homie - Vocals, Lyrics 
 Dr. Rev. M. Persival Smint - Vocals - (1)
 Jamie Madrox - Vocals, Lyrics - (3, 6, 10, 11, 15, 16)
 Kung Fu Vampire - Vocals, Lyrics - (3)
 Randal Witsworth - Vocals - (4)
 DJ Swamp - Vocals, Lyrics, Cuts - (5, 9, 11, 13)
 Anybody Killa - Vocals, Lyrics - (6)
 The R.O.C. - Vocals, Lyrics - (8)
 Lex "The Hex" Master - Vocals, Lyrics - (8)
 Boondox - Vocals, Lyrics - (10)
 Twiztid - Vocals, Lyrics - (13)
 Prozak - Vocals, Lyrics - (16)
 Fritz "The Cat" - Production - (1, 4, 14, 15, 16, 17)
 Seven - Production - (2, 5, 6, 8, 9, 10, 11, 12, 13)
 The Dead Beatz - Production - (3, 7)

Chart positions

References

2016 albums
Blaze Ya Dead Homie albums
Majik Ninja Entertainment albums
Albums produced by Seven (record producer)